Toshikazu Sugihara (born 8 April 1964) is a Japanese professional golfer.

Sugihara played on the Japan Golf Tour, winning once.

Professional wins (2)

Japan Golf Tour wins (1)

Japan Challenge Tour wins (1)

External links

Japanese male golfers
Japan Golf Tour golfers
Sportspeople from Osaka Prefecture
1964 births
Living people